Mahina may refer to:

 Mahina (mythology), a lunar deity, mother of Hema
 Mahina, French Polynesia
 A.S. Olympique de Mahina, an association football club
 Mahina, Mali
 Cyclone Mahina of 1899
 Mahina, a Hindi word for month, see Hindu calendar